Fairhaven is an unincorporated community and census-designated place (CDP) in Fair Haven Township, Stearns County, Minnesota, United States. Its population was 358 as of the 2010 census.

The community is located near the junction of Stearns County Roads 7 and 44.  Nearby places include Kimball, South Haven, Clearwater, and St. Augusta.  Stearns County Road 45 is also in the immediate area.

Fairhaven contains one property listed on the National Register of Historic Places: the 1867 Fair Haven Flour Mill.

Demographics

References

Census-designated places in Stearns County, Minnesota
Census-designated places in Minnesota